The Evergreen River is a river in north east Wisconsin that flows through Langlade and Menominee counties. The source of the river is Flora Lake in the Town of Evergreen. The Evergreen River conjoins the Wolf River south of Markton. The majority of land around the river is wooded and largely undeveloped.

The Evergreen River State Fishery Area follows the course of the river for a few miles in Langlade County. The land is owned and operated by the Wisconsin Department of Natural Resources.

See also
 List of Wisconsin rivers

References

Rivers of Wisconsin